Tanjong is a federal constituency in Northeast Penang Island District, Penang, Malaysia, that has been represented in the Dewan Rakyat since 1959.

The federal constituency was created in the 1958 redistribution and is mandated to return a single member to the Dewan Rakyat under the first-past-the-post voting system.

At 6 km2, it is the smallest parliamentary constituency in Malaysia.

Demographics 
https://live.chinapress.com.my/ge15/parliament/PENANG

History

Polling districts 
According to the federal gazette issued on 31 October 2022, the Tanjong constituency is divided into 37 polling districts.

Representation history

State constituency

Current state assembly members

Local governments

Election results

References

Penang federal constituencies